Uroš Đurđević (born 2 March 1994), commonly known as Đuka, is a Montenegrin professional footballer who plays as a striker for Spanish club Sporting Gijón. Born in Serbia, he represents the Montenegro national team.

Club career

Early years
Đurđević made his first football steps at Obrenovac 1905, before joining the youth system of Red Star Belgrade. He also briefly played for OFK Beograd, before joining the youth setup of Rad.

Rad
Đurđević made his senior debut for Rad on 28 August 2011, under manager Slavko Petrović, coming on as a substitute for Luka Milivojević in a 1–2 home league loss to Sloboda Užice. He appeared in a total of seven league games in his debut season, exclusively as a substitute. On 17 November 2012, Đurđević scored his first ever senior goal for Rad, giving his team a 1–0 home league win over Hajduk Kula. He netted a total of nine league goals in the 2012–13 campaign, led by Marko Nikolić, helping his team finish middle of the table. Despite numerous speculation during the 2013 summer transfer window, Đurđević eventually stayed with the Građevinari until the end of the year.

Vitesse
In January 2014, Đurđević joined Dutch club Vitesse and was given the number 9 shirt. He made his Eredivisie debut on 7 February 2014, entering the match as an 88th-minute substitute for Lucas Piazon in a 0–0 home draw with ADO Den Haag. Until the end of the 2013–14 Eredivisie, Đurđević made five more appearances, coming on as a substitute in all five games, but failed to score any goals.

On 30 July 2014, Đurđević scored the last goal in a 1–3 friendly loss to Chelsea. He was still struggling to earn a first team spot in the 2014–15 campaign, despite scoring regularly for the reserves. On 1 February 2015, two minutes after replacing Bertrand Traoré, Đurđević scored the only goal in the 85th minute to give Vitesse a 1–0 win over Ajax. The goal was compared to Dennis Bergkamp's one against Newcastle United from 2002.

After featuring in two games early into the 2015–16 season, Đurđević terminated his contract with Vitesse by mutual agreement on 14 August 2015.

Palermo
On 18 August 2015, Đurđević was signed by Italian club Palermo. He marked his Serie A debut by scoring an 88th-minute equalizer after coming off the bench in a 2–2 home draw with Carpi on 13 September 2015. Unfortunately, in his second appearance for the Rosanero, Đurđević fractured his ankle in a game against Milan at San Siro on 19 September 2015. He returned to action on 12 December 2015, being substituted at half-time by Alberto Gilardino, in an eventual 4–1 win over Frosinone at the Stadio Renzo Barbera. On 7 February 2016, Đurđević scored his second goal in Serie A, netting the equalizer in a 2–2 draw against Sassuolo. He collected a total of 14 league appearances and scored two times in the 2015–16 campaign.

Partizan

2016–17 season
On 22 August 2016, Đurđević returned to his homeland and signed with Partizan, on a three-year deal. He made his debut for the club on 27 August, coming on as a second-half substitute for Valeri Bojinov in a 4–0 home win over his former club Rad. On 21 September, Đurđević scored his first two goals for Partizan in a 3–1 Serbian Cup win over Napredak Kruševac. He scored his first goal in the league on 2 October in a 3–1 home win over Mladost Lučani. On 11 December, Đurđević netted a hat-trick to lead Partizan to a 3–1 win away at Čukarički. He opened the scoring after just 10 seconds into the match, setting the record for the fastest ever goal in the top flight of Serbian football. On 4 March 2017, Đurđević scored his first goal in the Belgrade derby, heading in Miroslav Vulićević's cross in the 88th minute of a 1–1 away draw. He found the back of the net seven times in the next six fixtures, eventually finishing the campaign as the league's top scorer with 24 goals, as well as his teammate Leonardo, helping Partizan win the title. His performances also earned him the league's Player of the Season award and selection in the competition's Team of the Season. In the second part of the season, Đurđević also scored two more goals in the Serbian Cup, as the club collected the double.

2017–18 season
On 11 July 2017, Đurđević scored his first goal in UEFA competitions, converting a penalty kick in a 2–0 home win over Budućnost Podgorica in the first leg of the Champions League second qualifying round. He subsequently netted once in the league's opener versus Mačva Šabac on 22 July, an eventual 6–1 home victory. On 2 August, Đurđević scored an 85th-minute equalizer to give his team a 2–2 draw against Olympiacos in the return leg of the Champions League third qualifying round, as Partizan were eliminated 3–5 on aggregate. He eventually helped the side reach the group stage of the Europa League after scoring a brace in a 4–0 victory away at Videoton in the competition's play-off round second leg.

Olympiacos
On 30 August 2017, Đurđević was transferred to Greek club Olympiacos for €2.5 million plus 15% from future transfer fee. He made his league debut for the side in a 1–1 away draw against Xanthi on 9 September, being substituted for Emmanuel Emenike in the 60th minute. Three days later, Đurđević played 62 minutes on his Champions League debut, before being replaced by Emenike again in an eventual 3–2 home loss to Sporting CP. He scored his first goal for the club on 16 September, converting a penalty in second-half injury time versus Asteras Tripoli in a 1–1 home draw. Throughout the 2017–18 season with Olympiacos, Đurđević made 30 appearances in all competitions and scored seven goals in the process.

Sporting Gijón
On 21 August 2018, Đurđević moved to Spain and joined Segunda División side Sporting Gijón. He became the most expensive transfer in the club's history, for an estimated amount of €2.5 million.

On 11 October 2020, after scoring three goals in the first three matches of the season, Đurđević was named Segunda División Player of the Month of September.

International career

Youth
Initially, Đurđević represented Serbia at the 2012 UEFA Under-19 Championship, as the team exited the tournament at the group stage. He subsequently led them to the 2013 UEFA Under-19 Championship, scoring a brace against Slovakia in the elite qualifying round. At the final tournament, Đurđević was one of the team's most influential players, scoring the opening goal in the semi-final against Portugal, as they progressed through to the final after penalties. Serbia eventually won the title after defeating France 1–0 in the gold medal match.

On 22 March 2013, Đurđević made his debut for Serbia at under-21 level in a 1–2 friendly loss away against the Netherlands U21s. He scored his first goal for the team on 14 August 2013, in a 4–1 home friendly win over the Macedonia under-21 side. Afterwards, Đurđević was their regular member during the UEFA Under-21 Championship 2015 qualifying stage, as Serbia qualified to the final tournament. He ultimately declined a call-up by Mladen Dodić in order to better prepare for the next season.

In the UEFA Under-21 Championship 2017 qualifying stage, Đurđević was the team's top scorer with nine goals, while captaining the side on most occasions. He netted a hat-trick in a 3–1 home win over Slovenia in the final group match. In addition, Đurđević scored once in the first leg of the play-off round versus Norway, as Serbia ultimately secured a spot in the final tournament. He was named in the final 23-man squad by newly appointed manager Nenad Lalatović in May 2017. In the second match of the group stage, Đurđević scored a header late to earn a 2–2 draw with Macedonia. He concluded his youth national team career on 23 June 2017, receiving a red card during the first half of Serbia's game against Spain.

Senior
On 9 March 2017, Đurđević received his first call-up to the full squad by manager Slavoljub Muslin for Serbia's World Cup 2018 qualifier against Georgia. He was an unused substitute in an eventual 3–1 success.

In 2021, he became a citizen of Montenegro and accepted an invitation to the Montenegro national football team. His father was born in Titograd (now Podgorica, Montenegro), which was a condition cited for him becoming a Montenegrin citizen. He made his debut on 24 March 2021 in a World Cup qualifier against Latvia.

Personal life
His younger brother, Kristijan (b. 1996), is also a footballer.

Career statistics

Club

International

Honours
Partizan
 Serbian SuperLiga: 2016–17
 Serbian Cup: 2016–17

Serbia
 UEFA Under-19 Championship: 2013

Individual
 Serbian SuperLiga top scorer: 2016–17
 Serbian SuperLiga Player of the Season: 2016–17
 Serbian SuperLiga Team of the Season: 2016–17
 Segunda División Player of the Month: September 2020

Records
 Serbia U21 all-time top scorer: 16 goals

Notes

References

External links

 
 
 
 

1994 births
Living people
Footballers from Belgrade
Montenegrin footballers
Montenegro international footballers
Serbian footballers
Serbia under-21 international footballers
Serbia youth international footballers
Serbian people of Montenegrin descent
Serbs of Montenegro
Association football forwards
FK Rad players
SBV Vitesse players
Palermo F.C. players
FK Partizan players
Olympiacos F.C. players
Sporting de Gijón players
Serbian SuperLiga players
Eredivisie players
Serie A players
Super League Greece players
Segunda División players
Montenegrin expatriate footballers
Serbian expatriate footballers
Expatriate footballers in Greece
Expatriate footballers in Italy
Expatriate footballers in Spain
Expatriate footballers in the Netherlands
Montenegrin expatriate sportspeople in Spain
Serbian expatriate sportspeople in Greece
Serbian expatriate sportspeople in Italy
Serbian expatriate sportspeople in Spain
Serbian expatriate sportspeople in the Netherlands